Rafael Nadal defeated the three-time defending champion David Ferrer in the final, 6–0, 6–2 to win the men's singles tennis title at the 2013 Mexican Open.

Seeds

Draw

Finals

Top half

Bottom half

Qualifying

Seeds

Qualifiers

Lucky loser
  Antonio Veić

Draw

First qualifier

Second qualifier

Third qualifier

Fourth qualifier

References
Main Draw
Qualifying Draw

2013 Abierto Mexicano Telcel